Eva Schloss  (née Geiringer; born 11 May 1929) is an Austrian-English Holocaust survivor, memoirist and stepdaughter of Otto Frank, the father of Margot and diarist Anne Frank. Schloss speaks widely of her family's experiences during the Holocaust and is a participant in the USC Shoah Foundation's Visual History Archive project to record video answers to be used in educational tools.

Early life
Eva Geiringer was born in Vienna to a Jewish family. Her older brother, Heinz, was born in 1926. Shortly after the annexation of Austria by Germany in 1938, her family emigrated to Belgium and finally to the Netherlands. She lived in the same apartment block in Amsterdam as Anne Frank, and the girls, only a month apart in age, were sometimes playmates from ages 11 to 13. In 1942, both girls went into hiding to avoid the Nazi effort to capture the Jews of Amsterdam. In May 1944, Schloss's family was captured by the Nazis after being betrayed by a double agent in the Dutch underground, and transported to the Auschwitz-Birkenau Nazi concentration camps. Her father and brother did not survive the ordeal, but she and her mother were barely alive when they were freed in 1945 by Soviet troops.

They returned to Amsterdam, and during that time, Schloss and her mother renewed their friendship with Otto Frank, who was at that time contending with the loss of his wife and children, and the discovery of his daughter Anne's diary. In November 1953, Schloss's mother Elfriede (1905–1998) married Otto Frank.

Post-war life 
Schloss continued her schooling and then studied art history at the University of Amsterdam. She then traveled to England to study photography for a year. While there, she met and married Zvi Schloss, a Jewish refugee from Germany whose father was imprisoned at Dachau concentration camp, and who had been living in Palestine. The couple subsequently settled in England and  took British citizenship.

Schloss has three daughters and lives in London. Her husband died in 2016.

In June 2021, Schloss became a dual citizen of the United Kingdom and Austria, taking up Austrian citizenship again as a gesture of reconciliation with her native country.

Outreach

Schloss did not talk about her experiences in the concentration camp until after Otto's death in 1980. Having experienced her stepfather's emotional involvement with Anne and the preservation of her memory, she felt compelled to take on the responsibility of keeping Anne Frank's name alive. Schloss began to speak of her family's experiences during the Holocaust at educational institutions. She is a co-founder of The Anne Frank Trust UK, and playwright James Still described her experiences as a persecuted young Jewish woman in the play And Then They Came for Me – Remembering the World of Anne Frank. 

In an effort to preserve the memories of Holocaust survivors for future generations, Schloss participated in the USC Shoah Foundation's Visual History Archive project, in which she recorded answers to numerous questions while holographic technology recorded the sessions. The hologram has now become a part of interactive displays at museums, where people can ask questions and receive recorded answers from the hologram. 

During a March 2019 book tour in Orange County, California, Schloss met with a group of Newport Harbor High School students, parents and staff members. The prior week, students from Newport Harbor, Costa Mesa and Estancia high schools gave Nazi salutes as they posed for photos at a party in front of cups arranged in the shape of a swastika while playing a variation of beer pong. Schloss talked to the students about her experience in the Holocaust when she was around their ages in an effort to educate them on the implications of the imagery they used.

Honours
Schloss was awarded an honorary doctorate by Northumbria University in 2001. She was honoured with an MBE in the 2013 New Year's Honours and the Medal for Services to the Republic of Austria on the occasion of her taking Austrian citizenship in 2021.

Works
 Eva's Story (1988)
 The Promise (2006)
 After Auschwitz: My Memories of Otto and Anne Frank (2013)

References

External links
 
 Eva Schloss website
 Anne Sebba: "The story of Eva Schloss, Anne Frank's stepsister", The Times, 6 January 2009.
 Candice Krieger: "Eva Schloss is using her experience of Auschwitz and the Nazis to fight knife crime", The Jewish Chronicle, 28 August 2008.
 Ori Golan: "Anne Frank: A Stepsister’s Story", The Jewish Journal of Greater Los Angeles; accessed 26 September 2014. 
 "Remembering Anne Frank", cnn.com; accessed 26 September 2014.

1929 births
20th-century Austrian women writers
20th-century Austrian writers
21st-century Austrian women writers
Auschwitz concentration camp survivors
Austrian Jews
Living people
Members of the Order of the British Empire
Naturalised citizens of the United Kingdom
Writers from London
Writers from Vienna
Women in World War II
Anne Frank
British Jews